The Scottish Men's Open Amateur Stroke Play Championship is the national amateur stroke play golf championship in Scotland. Entry is open to all amateur golfers. It has been played annually since 1967 and is organised by the Scottish Golf. The format is 72-hole stroke-play contested over three days. After 36 holes the leading 40 competitors and ties play a further 36 holes on the final day.

History
The event was started in 1967, based on the format of the Brabazon Trophy which had been played in England since 1947. It was held on 1 and 2 July with 36 holes played each day. Two courses, Muirfield and Gullane No. 1, were used on the first day after which the leading 40 and ties played 36 holes at Muirfield on the final day. Bernard Gallacher win with a score of 291, five strokes ahead of Charlie Green. A similar format was generally used in following years, with two courses used on the opening day. Starting in 1968 the championship was played in June for many years. Ronnie Shade won by six strokes in 1968 at Prestwick. There was another Scottish winner in 1969, Scott Macdonald, although two English golfers, Peter Benka and Rodney Foster were runners-up.

1970 saw the first non-Scottish winner, when the South African Dale Hayes won by four strokes. Ian Hutcheon won in 1971 and would win again in 1974 and 1979. Bert Nicholson won in 1972 while 1973 produced the only tie in the event, when Gordon Clark, from England, and David Robertson finished level. There was no playoff. the experienced Charlie Green won in 1975 while Steve Martin won by a record 11 strokes in 1976. There were further Scottish winners in 1977 and 1978 with Paul McKellar and Alistair Taylor. Mike Miller was a runner-up three times between 1975 and 1978 but never won the championship. Gordon Brand Jnr win in 1980 when the event was reduced to 54 holes by heavy rain on the first day.

The 1980s produced two overseas winners. In 1981, Philip Walton, from Ireland, won by a stroke from defending champion Gordon Brand Jnr, while in 1989 Frenchman François Illouz won by two strokes. Charlie Green won for the second time in 1984, while Colin Montgomerie won by five strokes in 1985. The 1990 event was reduced to 36 holes by harr. 1996 saw the first playoff in the championship. Alastair Forsyth and South African Hennie Otto were tied on 279 and it took nine sudden-death holes before Forsyth won. there were further playoffs in 2000 and 2001 won by Simon Mackenzie and the Australian John Sutherland.

Gary Wolstenholme won the 2003, the first English winner since 1973. Richie Ramsay won in 2004 with a record score of 269, but there was another English winner in 2005, Robert Dinwiddie. Wallace Booth won in 2008, a contest reduced to 54 holes. Tommy Fleetwood won in 2009 with a new record score of 268, eight strokes ahead of the field.

Pre-qualifying, for players without a guaranteed place, was introduced in 2022. A single round was played a few days before the championship.

Winners

Source:

See also
Scottish Amateur
Helen Holm Scottish Women's Open Championship – the equivalent championship for women

References

External links
Scottish Golf
List of winners

Amateur golf tournaments in the United Kingdom
Golf tournaments in Scotland
1967 establishments in Scotland
Recurring sporting events established in 1967
Annual sporting events in the United Kingdom